Anatoli Anatolyevich Piskunov (born 2 January 1949) is a former Russian professional footballer.

He made his professional debut in the Soviet First League in 1969 for FC Volga Kalinin.

Honours
 Soviet Top League runner-up: 1970.
 Soviet Cup winner: 1970.
 European Cup Winners' Cup 1971–72 finalist (1 game).

References

1949 births
People from Saratov Oblast
Living people
Russian footballers
Soviet footballers
FC Dynamo Moscow players
Soviet Top League players
FC Lokomotiv Moscow players
FC Kuban Krasnodar players
Association football forwards
Sportspeople from Saratov Oblast